Stefan Wächter (born 20 April 1978) is a German former professional footballer, who played as a goalkeeper, and a goalkeeper coach. He was most recently the goalkeeper coach of Hamburger SV.

Career
Wächter lost his starting place at Hamburger SV to former Schalke 04 keeper Frank Rost, and after the season it was announced he had joined Rostock as their starting keeper, to accompany them in the Bundesliga.

Honours
Hamburger SV
DFL-Ligapokal: 2003
UEFA Intertoto Cup: 2005

References

External links
 

1978 births
Living people
People from Herne, North Rhine-Westphalia
Sportspeople from Arnsberg (region)
Association football goalkeepers
German footballers
Hamburger SV players
Hamburger SV II players
VfL Bochum II players
FC Hansa Rostock players
Bundesliga players
KFC Uerdingen 05 players
SC Westfalia Herne players
Footballers from North Rhine-Westphalia